Grigoris Grigoriou (1919–2005) was a Greek screenwriter and film director.

Selected filmography
 Red Cliff (1949)
 Storm at the Lighthouse (1950)
 Bitter Bread (1951)
 The Big Streets (1953)

References

Bibliography 
 Vrasidas Karalis. A History of Greek Cinema. A&C Black, 2012.

External links 
 

1919 births
2005 deaths
Film people from Athens
Greek screenwriters
Greek film directors
20th-century screenwriters